Free economic zone Grodnoinvest – a unique investment platform in Belarus, located directly on the border of the European and Eurasian Economic Unions, Europe and Asia, the leader in the Republic of Belarus in attracting foreign investment. Year of foundation: 2002. Territory: 4156 ha in 8 cities of Grodno region - Grodno, Lida, Schuchin, Smorgon, Mosty, Slonim, Novogrudok, Svisloch. Number of residents: more than 70. Managment: Administration of FEZ Grodnoinvest.

The residents of FEZ Grodnoinvest are the world's leading companies in the field of woodworking and furniture production, mechanical engineering and metalworking, food, chemical and light industries, agriculture. During the period of the FEZ's activity, $2+ billion of investments were attracted from 35+ countries. The FEZ has created attractive conditions for export-oriented companies. The turnover of residents of FEZ Grodnoinvest exceeded $2 billion. The largest sales markets for residents of FEZ Grodnoinvest include Russia, the countries of the European Union, Kazakhstan. In total, the export geography includes more than 65 countries. FEZ Grodnoinvest residents export a wide range of products of the chemical industry (acids and anhydrides, polyesters, fertilizers), agriculture (rapeseed and soybean oil), woodworking (wood-shaving and fibreboards, furniture), light industry (hosiery), mechanical engineering and metalworking (wires, auto components), etc.

Attractive conditions fot the investors are included tax, customs and other preferences. Investors are exempt from paying income tax, real estate tax, rent for land plots that are provided without an auction, payment of customs duties, taxes and non-tariff regulation in relation to foreign goods imported into the territory of the FEZ, payments for the right to conclude a lease agreement for a land plot provided for the implementation of an investment project, reimbursement of forest and agricultural losses in the seizure of agricultural land and forest land and their provision to FEZ residents for the implementation of investment projects.

External links 
Grodnoinvest Free Economic Zone

Economy of Belarus
Free economic zones of Belarus